Herbert Bouffler (16 February 1881, date of death unknown) was a British cyclist. He won a silver medal at the 1906 Intercalated Games and competed in the 20km event at the 1908 Summer Olympics.

References

External links
 

1881 births
Year of death missing
British male cyclists
Olympic cyclists of Great Britain
Cyclists at the 1906 Intercalated Games
Cyclists at the 1908 Summer Olympics
People from Hackney Central
Cyclists from Greater London
Medalists at the 1906 Intercalated Games